Black Mountain Peninsula, located in Acton, Australian Capital Territory, a suburb of the capital Canberra, is a prominent area on the western region of Lake Burley Griffin. It is popular for water recreation and picnics.

References

Geography of Canberra
Peninsulas of the Australian Capital Territory